Padovan is a surname. Notable people with the surname include:

Arigo Padovan (born 1927), Italian cyclist
Fabio Padovan (born 1955), Italian politician
Richard Padovan (born 1935), English architect, writer and translator
Stefano Padovan (born 1994), Italian footballer

See also
Padovan sequence, integer sequence